A sacrament is a Christian rite, including:

 Sacrament (Community of Christ), one of eight rites in the Community of Christ, formerly the Reorganized Church of Jesus Christ of Latter Day Saints
 Sacrament (LDS Church), a reference to the Lord's Supper, in The Church of Jesus Christ of Latter-day Saints 
 Holy Mysteries or Sacraments of the Eastern Orthodox Church (see Holy Mystery), analogous to Sacraments of the Catholic Church
 Sacramenta Argentaria, the Oaths of Strasbourg
 Sacramental, a token object or action of respect (sacramentalia) associated with the Sacraments, meant to inspire or demonstrate piousness and devotion to God
 Sacraments of the Roman Catholic Church

Sacrament(s)  or The Sacrament may also refer to:

Film and television
 The Sacrament (1989 film), a Belgian comedy film
 The Sacrament (2013 film), an American horror film
 "Sacrament" (Mare of Easttown), a 2021 television episode
 "Sacrament" (Millennium), a 1997 television episode

Literature
 Sacrament (novel), a 1996 novel by Clive Barker
 Sacrament, the 2003 expanded edition of You Shall Know Our Velocity, a 2002 novel by Dave Eggers

Music
 Sacrament (band), an American Christian metal group
 Sacrament (album), by Lamb of God, 2006
 "The Sacrament" (song), by HIM, 2003

See also
 Catholic sacraments (disambiguation)
 Seven sacraments (disambiguation)
 Sacramento (disambiguation)
 Sacramentum (disambiguation)